Khaosan Road or Khao San Road is a short ( long) street in central Bangkok, Thailand constructed in 1892 during the reign of Rama V. It is in the Bang Lamphu area of Phra Nakhon District about  north of the Grand Palace and Wat Phra Kaew.

Background

"Khaosan" translates as 'milled rice', a hint that in former times the street was a major Bangkok rice market. In the last 40 years, however, Khaosan Road has developed into a world-famous "backpacker ghetto". It offers cheap accommodation, ranging from "mattress in a box"-style hotels to reasonably priced three-star hotels. In an essay on the backpacker culture of Khaosan Road, Susan Orlean called it "the place to disappear." According to the Khao San Business Association, the road sees 40,000-50,000 tourists per day in the high season, and 20,000 per day in the low season.

Visitors to Khao San Road are a disparate lot:

It is also a base of travel: coaches leave daily for all major tourist destinations in Thailand, from Chiang Mai in the north to 
Ko Pha-ngan in the south, and there are many relatively inexpensive travel agents who can arrange visas and transportation to the neighbouring countries of Cambodia, Laos, Malaysia, and Vietnam.

Khaosan shops sell handicrafts, paintings, clothes, local fruits, unlicensed CDs, DVDs, a wide range of fake IDs, used books, and other useful backpacker items. After dark, bars open, music is played, food hawkers sell barbecued insects and other exotic snacks for tourists, and touts promote ping pong shows.

The area is internationally known as a center of dancing, partying, and just prior to the traditional Thai New Year (Songkran festival) of 13–15 April, water splashing that usually turns into a huge water fight. One Thai writer has described Khaosan as "...a short road that has the longest dream in the world".

A Buddhist temple under royal patronage, the centuries-old Wat Chana Songkram, is directly opposite Khaosan Road to the west, while the area to the northwest contains an Islamic community and several small mosques.

Conflict
In July 2018, the Bangkok Metropolitan Administration (BMA), in an attempt to clean up Khaosan Road, announced that street vendors would be removed from the thoroughfare from 1 August 2018. The BMA intends to move them to a nearby area and restrict their trading hours to 18:00 to midnight. The Khaosan Street Vendors Association, representing some 300 vendors, rejected the move, citing financial ruin for vendors. Last-minute negotiations between the BMA and vendors proved fruitless as neither side has been willing to compromise. Khaosan vendors announced that, in defiance of BMA order, they will open as usual on 1 August. On the first day of the ban on stalls, roughly 70 percent of the vendors opened as usual in defiance of the police.

Facelift

The BMA announced in 2019 that it will commit 48.8 million baht to transform Khaosan Road into an "international walking street". The US$1.6 million project, the first makeover of the road since its creation in 1892, will commence in October 2019, continue through the tourist high-season, and be completed by February 2020. The project will repave footpaths and create designated 1.5 m x 2 m spaces for 240–360 licensed Thai vendors drawn by lot.  Vehicles will be prohibited on Khaosan Road from 09:00–21:00 daily.

See also
 Banana Pancake Trail

References

External links

 
 Khaosan Road Survival Guide
 Ultimate Guide to Khao San Road

Khaosan
Neighbourhoods of Bangkok
Tourist attractions in Bangkok
Shopping districts and streets in Thailand
Phra Nakhon district